Sochi Airport is a railway station in Sochi, Russia. It is located next to the Sochi International Airport in Adler District of Sochi. There is a direct walking bridge from the platform to the airport building.

History
The construction of the station began in 2009. The station has 3 lifts and escalators.

The grand opening was held on 27 January 2012.

Trains
 Sochi – Airport Sochi (every 15 minutes)
 Tuapse – Airport Sochi (2 trains a day)

References

Railway stations in Sochi
Railway stations in Russia opened in 2012